OFD may refer to:

Occupancy frequency distribution
Oakland Fire Department
Orange Fire Department
Ogof Ffynnon Ddu, an extensive cave system in South Wales
Orofaciodigital syndrome
One Fine Day (U.S. TV series), a 2007–2008 American Internet Protocol television series produced in conjunction with students from a variety of Big Ten Universities